The future is the time after the present.

Future or The Future may also refer to:

Music

Performers
 Future (rapper) (born 1983), American rapper
 The Human League, previously The Future, an English synth-pop band 
 The Future X, a pop group created in Los Angeles in 2022 by Simon Fuller

Albums
 Future (Don Diablo album), 2018
 Future (Future album), 2017
 Future (Schiller album) or the title song, 2016
 Future (The Seeds album), 1967
 The Future (From Ashes to New album) or the title song, 2018
 The Future (Guy album) or the title song, 1990
 The Future (Leonard Cohen album) or the title song, 1992
 The Future (Rodney P album) or the title song, 2004
 The Future, by Mr. Del, 2005
 The Future, by Jamoa Jam, 2001

Songs
 "Future" (Madonna and Quavo song), 2019
 "The Future" (song), by Prince, 1990
 "I Miss You" / "The Future", by Cute, 2014
 "Future", by Chai from Punk, 2019
 "Future", by Golden Earring from Cut, 1982
 "Future", by J-Hope from Jack in the Box, 2022
 "Future", by Paramore from Paramore, 2013
 "Future", by Red Velvet from the soundtrack of the TV series Start-Up, 2020
 "The Future", by Bo Burnham from The Inside Outtakes, 2022
 "The Future", by David Guetta from Nothing but the Beat, 2011
 "The Future", by Joe Budden from Padded Room, 2009
 "The Future", by San Holo, 2017
 "The Future (Isn't What It Used to Be)", by Pseudo Echo from Teleporter, 2000
 "Good Morning (The Future)", by Rogue Wave from Permalight, 2010

Television, film, and audio
 The Future (film), a 2011 film by Miranda July
 The Future (audio drama), an audio drama based on the British TV series Doctor Who
 Future Television, a Lebanese television broadcaster
 Steven Universe Future, a 2019 American animated television series; epilogue to Steven Universe
 "The Future" (Steven Universe Future), the 2020 final episode of Steven Universe Future

Other uses
 Future (programming), a computer science term
 Future (train), an excursion train in Taiwan
 Future Group, Indian private conglomerate
 Future perfect, a grammatical form to describe an event expected to happen before a time of reference in the future
 Future plc, a British publishing company
 Future Systems, a London-based architectural and design practice
 Future tense, in grammar
 The Future: Six Drivers of Global Change, a 2013 book by Al Gore
 The Future Awards Africa, a Nigerian award series for youths 18–30

See also 
 Al-Mustaqbal (disambiguation) (Arabic for "future")
 Ancient Future (disambiguation)
 Futur (disambiguation)
 Futures (disambiguation)
 Futurism (disambiguation)